Parisotoma is a genus of elongate-bodied springtails in the family Isotomidae. There are about 11 described species in Parisotoma.

Species
These 11 species belong to the genus Parisotoma:
 Parisotoma confusoculata Salmon, 1944 c g
 Parisotoma dichaeta Yosii, 1969 g
 Parisotoma dividua Salmon, 1944 c g
 Parisotoma notabilis (Schäffer, 1896) c b
 Parisotoma obscurocellata g
 Parisotoma picea Salmon, 1949 c g
 Parisotoma postantennala Salmon, 1949 c g
 Parisotoma quinquedentata Salmon, 1943 c g
 Parisotoma reducta (Rusek, 1984) g
 Parisotoma sexsetosa g
 Parisotoma trichaetosa (Martynova, 1977) g
Data sources: i = ITIS, c = Catalogue of Life, g = GBIF, b = Bugguide.net

References

Further reading

External links

 

Collembola
Springtail genera